Janale is a town in the southeastern Lower Shebelle (Shabeellaha Hoose) region of Somalia.

The late Aden Abdullah Osman Daar (Adan Cadde), Somalia's first president, had a farm in the town.

Notes

References
Janaale

See also
 Port of Merca
 Genale

Populated places in Lower Shebelle